WONN (1230 kHz) is a commercial AM radio station broadcasting a soft oldies and adult standards radio format.  Licensed to Lakeland, Florida, the station is owned by Hall Communications, Inc.  WONN is also heard on an FM translator, 107.1 MHz W296CS.  WONN carries the syndicated "America's Best Music" network from Westwood One.

WONN's transmitter is atop the office building where WONN has its studios and offices, on Lime Street at Sikes Boulevard in Lakeland.  WONN is powered at 1,000 watts, day and night, using a non-directional antenna.

History
On September 15, 1949, the station first signed on.  In 1981, current owner Hall Communications bought WONN, along with FM sister station 97.5 WPCV in Winter Haven, for $2 million.

References

External links

ONN
Soft adult contemporary radio stations in the United States
Oldies radio stations in the United States
Adult standards radio stations in the United States
Radio stations established in 1949
1949 establishments in Florida